12-volt battery may refer to:

Automotive battery
Lantern battery
A23 battery, for RF transmitters